James Alfred Farr (born Friday, May 18, 1956) is a former Major League Baseball pitcher who played for the Texas Rangers in .

Amateur career
A native of Waverly, New York, Farr attended Penn State University. In 1976 and 1977, he played collegiate summer baseball with the Wareham Gatemen of the Cape Cod Baseball League.

Professional career
Farr was drafted three times before signing with a team. In , the Chicago White Sox selected him in the ninth round of the June Regular Phase amateur entry draft. In , the San Francisco Giants took him in the 15th round of the June Regular Phase amateur entry draft.

On September 7, 1982, Farr made his major league debut. He appeared in a total of five games in the  season, pitching a total of 18 innings and with an ERA of 2.50. In those 18 innings pitched, Farr threw one wild pitch, walked seven, and struck out only six.

Less than one month after his debut, on October 3, 1982, Farr pitched his final Major League game.

Coaching career
After ending his playing career, Farr coached at the College of William and Mary and compiled a record of 373-310-2 in 13 seasons. While at William and Mary in 1996, Farr was accused by two former players of being racist and violent towards one player.

References

External links

1956 births
Living people
Baseball players from New York (state)
Kansas City Royals scouts
Major League Baseball pitchers
Maryland Terrapins baseball coaches
Old Dominion Monarchs baseball coaches
Penn State Nittany Lions baseball coaches
Penn State Nittany Lions baseball players
Texas Rangers players
Wareham Gatemen players
William & Mary Tribe baseball coaches
People from Waverly, Tioga County, New York